A penumbral lunar eclipse took place on Tuesday, May 25, 1937, the first of two lunar eclipses in 1937.

Visibility

Related lunar eclipses

Half-Saros cycle
A lunar eclipse will be preceded and followed by solar eclipses by 9 years and 5.5 days (a half saros). This lunar eclipse is related to one total and one partial = two solar eclipses of Solar Saros 117.

See also
List of lunar eclipses
List of 20th-century lunar eclipses

Notes

External links

1937-05
1937 in science